Jewels (styled JEWELS in capitals) is a mixed martial arts organization owned by Marverous Japan Co., Ltd. focused on female fighters. It is the direct successor of Smackgirl. It has a working relationship with fellow mixed martial arts promotion Deep presided by Shigeru Saeki (also the Jewels supervisor).

History
After the women MMA promotion Smackgirl faced severe financial difficulties caused by the unexpected departure of major sponsors and television network deals, an executive from Japanese event production company Archery Inc., Yuichi Ozono, formed the company Marverous Japan and acquired the assets and rights formerly belonging to Smackgirl parent company Kilgore. Since the reputation of Smackgirl was tarnished by all the problems it faced, it was decided to start anew.

On June 9, 2012, it was announced that Jewels has formed a strategic partnership with American promotion Invicta Fighting Championships to cross-promote the world's top female fighters on their respective fight cards in the United States and Japan.

On  Jewels announced that it would cease operations as an independent company, with Yuichi Ozono, then head of Jewels, stepping down and Shigeru Saeki from Deep, formerly supervisor, taking the full direction, and transferring fighters and brand to the new Deep Jewels brand, which would be managed by Deep.

Current champions

Championship history

Featherweight championship

Bantamweight championship
Formerly known as middleweight until May 2015.

Flyweight championship

Strawweight championship
Formerly known as lightweight until May 2015.

Atomweight championship
Formerly known as featherweight until May 2015.

Microweight Championship 
A four woman tournament was scheduled prior to Deep Jewels 28 to crown the promotions first Microweight Champion with the challengers being Emi Sato, Mizuki Furuse, Suwanan Boonsorn and Yasuko Tamada with Moe Sasaki as reserve. Furuse and Boonsorn advanced to the final which was scheduled to take place at Deep Jewels 29 before the COVID-19 pandemic, however this event and the match couldn't be rescheduled when the promotion returned with the show. On November 5, it was announced that Furuse would be taking an extended absence as she was both pregnant and getting married. As a result of these developments, Jewels declared Boonsorn as the inaugural champion.

Tournament champions

Events

See also
List of Deep champions
List of Deep events
Deep Jewels events

Notes

References

External links
 
Official blog 
Public relations blog 
 
JEWELS event results on Sherdog
DEEP JEWELS event results on Tapology

2008 establishments in Japan
Mixed martial arts organizations
Organizations established in 2008
Mixed martial arts events lists
Women's mixed martial arts